The Lowell Line is a railroad line of the MBTA Commuter Rail system, running north from Boston to Lowell, Massachusetts. Originally built as the New Hampshire Main Line of the Boston & Lowell Railroad and later operated as part of the Boston & Maine Railroad's Southern Division, the line was one of the first railroads in North America and the first major one in Massachusetts.

All stations are accessible except for West Medford, Winchester Center, and Mishawum.

History

Boston and Lowell Railroad

The Boston and Lowell Railroad started freight operations in 1835, with traffic from the Lowell mills to the Boston port. Demand for the express passenger service exceeded expectations, and in 1842 local service was added as well.  The line north of Lowell was first owned by the Boston, Concord & Montreal Railroad, which was chartered in 1844. Trackage was completed as far as Wells River, Vermont, in 1853. The Boston & Maine Railroad (B&M) acquired the railroad in 1895. The line served as the route for Boston to Montreal service during the Golden Age of Rail (roughly 1880 to 1940). The Ambassador, the train from Boston's North Station to Montreal, ran through Concord, New Hampshire, along this line until 1966. This line, along with the New Englander, via Concord, White River Junction, Montpelier, ran through the northwestern section of Vermont prior to entering Quebec, Canada. The Alouette and Red Wing trains travelled to Montreal via Concord, Plymouth, Wells River and Newport in northeastern Vermont prior to entering Quebec. (The route via Wells River, St. Johnsbury and Newport was the more direct route of the two itineraries.) For this itinerary the Montreal route was marketed as an Air-line railroad.

Massive cutbacks on May 18, 1958, included the end of Stoneham Branch service and the closure of Medford Hillside, Tufts College, and North Somerville stations. Cuts on June 14, 1959, ended service north of Woburn on the Woburn Loop; trains for points north were rerouted via the mainline to the east. Boston–Lowell local service was halved to seven daily round trips; Tyngsboro, Bleachery, and South Wilmington stations were closed. B&M passenger service to Boston on the line was shortened from Concord, New Hampshire to Lowell in 1967.

MBTA era

In 1973, the MBTA bought the Lowell line, along with the Haverhill and all other local Greater Boston passenger lines. Along with the sale, the B&M contracted to run the passenger service on the Lowell line for the MBTA. After bankruptcy, the B&M continued to run and fulfill its commuter rail contract under the protection of the United States Bankruptcy Court, in the hopes that a reorganization could make it profitable again. It emerged from the court's protection when newly formed Guilford Transportation Industries (GTI) purchased it in 1983.

For approximately thirteen months in 1980-81, daily passenger service was provided to Concord. Two round-trips were operated on each weekday and one on weekend days. Originally, there were intermediate stops in Manchester and Nashua. A stop in Merrimack was added later. Service was discontinued when federal funding was withdrawn.

Anderson Regional Transportation Center opened on April 28, 2001, replacing Mishawum as the Lowell Line's primary park-and-ride station for Route 128. Mishawum was reduced to limited reverse-peak service. On December 15, 2001, the Amtrak Downeaster began operating over the line south of Wilmington. In October 2006, the MBTA added four short turn round trips that terminated at Anderson RTC. The line was shut down on weekends in July through September 2017 for the installation of Positive Train Control equipment in order to meet a 2020 federal deadline. 

Substantially reduced schedules due to the COVID-19 pandemic were in effect from March 16 to June 23, 2020, and from December 14, 2020, to April 5, 2021. On January 23, 2021, reduced schedules went into place with no weekend service on seven lines, including the Lowell Line. Weekend service on the seven lines resumed on July 3, 2021. , the line has  round trips on weekdays and nine on weekends. By October 2022, the line had 6,485 daily riders – 59% of pre-COVID ridership. In June 2022, the MBTA indicated it was considering improvements to a siding in Woburn, which would allow 30-minute headways between Boston and Anderson/Woburn by 2024.

The Medford Branch of the Green Line Extension, which opened on December 12, 2022, runs along the Lowell Line through Somerville and part of Medford. There are five Green Line stations on the branch, but no additional commuter rail stops were added.

Proposed expansion to New Hampshire

MBTA Commuter Rail service connecting Concord, Manchester and Nashua from the Lowell Line used to exist in New Hampshire until subsidies were ceased in 1967. The service came back in 1980 for a quick 13 month return, but the program grant was cut by the Reagan administration in 1981, and commuter rail service has remained not available. In October 2010, the New Hampshire Department of Transportation received a $2.24 million federal grant to study an extension of the Lowell Line to Concord. In January 2011, a bill was introduced into the New Hampshire legislature to end the proposed extension and give up a potential $4.1 million grant into its planning. The MBTA acquired trackage rights from Pan Am in May 2011 as part of a larger transaction.

The project was estimated to cost $246 million in a 2014 NHDOT report. Extending service to NH was projected to provide an expected 34 trains a day to Nashua and 16 a day to Manchester, connecting commuters from Nashua to Boston as low as 54 minutes and commuters from Manchester to Boston in as low as 1 hour and 25 minutes with 3,120 passengers a day. Proponents of the extension see expanded rail services as a link to Boston’s growing economy while opponents consider the project to be extraneous and expensive.

In December 2020, a $5.5 million contract was awarded to AECOM for preliminary engineering and design work, environmental and public engagement services, and final design, for the project to extend MBTA commuter rail service to southern New Hampshire. The project called for the extension of the Lowell Line up through Nashua and Manchester along an existing rail alignment. The proposed expansion would include four new stops: South Nashua, Crown Street in Nashua, Bedford, and Manchester. In January of 2022, the Manchester Board of Mayor and Aldermen approved the location for new facilities to house layover trains adjacent to the Manchester Transit Authority facilities. 

By autumn 2022, the study was being carried out by AECOM and the State of New Hampshire to design and make a financial plan for the project by 2023. In December 2022, the New Hampshire Executive Council voted to cease state funding for an extension of the AECOM study; the study reported an updated project cost of $782 million. The MBTA rail extension project to Manchester is currently in the pre-decisional stage, and is awaiting approval by the NH government.

Operations

Track speeds
South of Wilmington, the line has an unusual asymmetrical speed limit. Additional speed restrictions are in place at Wilmington, through the grade crossings in West Medford, and in the North Station terminal area.

Other services
Amtrak's Downeaster service to Maine, along with some Haverhill Line express trains, run on the Lowell Line from North Station to Wilmington, then follow the Wildcat Branch to the Haverhill Line. This routing is used to avoid the inner Haverhill Line, which has a number of single-track sections.

The line is the designated freight clearance route into Boston from the north; all stations with high-level platforms must either have mini-high platforms or a freight passing track. Pan Am Railways runs freight on the line, including local freights based out of Lawrence Yard and DOBO (a Dover to Boston through freight).

Station listing

Woburn Branch

References

External links 

 MBTA - Lowell Line
 Design, Environmental Review, and Financial Plan for Commuter Rail extension from MA to NH | New Hampshire DOT

MBTA Commuter Rail